Carlos Urizar (born 16 January 1957) is a Bolivian footballer. He played in eight matches for the Bolivia national football team in 1983. He was also part of Bolivia's squad for the 1983 Copa América tournament.

References

1957 births
Living people
Bolivian footballers
Bolivia international footballers
Place of birth missing (living people)
Association football defenders